The Forest and the Fort is an historical novel by the American writer Hervey Allen based upon the Siege of Fort Pitt in 1763. The book was a New York Times bestseller in 1943.

Set in colonial Pittsburgh, Pennsylvania, it is the story of Salatheil Albine, who was captured by Native Americans as a child and raised by them, and who manages to get back there. In addition to the Siege of Fort Pitt, the plot involves the march to Bedford Village after the siege was raised.

The Forest and the Fort is Book One of a planned North American historical romance called Sylvania. The other two novels of this sequence are Bedford Village and Toward the Morning.

References

External links
 Hervey Allen Papers, 1831-1965, SC.1952.01, Special Collections Department, University of Pittsburgh

1943 American novels
Farrar & Rinehart books
Novels set in Pittsburgh
Fiction set in 1763
Novels set in the 1760s